"Arlandria" is a song by American rock band Foo Fighters, released from their seventh studio album Wasting Light on September 18, 2011, as the fourth single in the United Kingdom.

Song information
The title is a reference to Arlandria, the Alexandria, Virginia, neighborhood where Dave Grohl lived. The lyrics include a reference to "Rain Rain Go Away," which Dave Grohl justified by saying "there's something about the singsong cadence of children's music that has its place in rock."

Arlandria is also referenced in the song "Headwires" off their 1999 album There is Nothing Left to Lose. At the end of that song, Grohl repeats the phrase "The sun is on Arlandria".

Music video
The first official music video used to promote the song was a live performance taken from the iTunes Festival London 2011, performed at the Roundhouse, London, UK.

On 22 June 2019 a second music video was released through the band's YouTube channel. It depicts a man being chased around San Francisco by numerous groups of costumed vigilantes. The video was released alongside three other videos for songs from Wasting Light, as well as a video for "The One".

Charts

References

External links
 Lyrics for this song at https://play.google.com/music/preview/Txfkorp46k74pbxjoluq2k4z5py?lyrics=1&pcampaignid=kp-lyrics&u=0#

Foo Fighters songs
2011 singles
Songs written by Dave Grohl
Song recordings produced by Butch Vig
2011 songs
RCA Records singles
Songs written by Pat Smear
Songs written by Taylor Hawkins
Songs written by Nate Mendel
Songs written by Chris Shiflett
Songs about Virginia